Sgurr Dubh (782 m) is a mountain in the Northwest Highlands, Scotland. It lies southwest of the village of Kinlochewe in Wester Ross.

The peak rises steeply on the south side of Glen Torridon. Although it is small compared to its giant neighbour Beinn Eighe on the other side of the glen, the mountain still has a character of its own.

References

Mountains and hills of the Northwest Highlands
Marilyns of Scotland
Corbetts